Whitechapel is an interchange station in Whitechapel, East London for London Underground, London Overground and Elizabeth line services. The station is located behind a street market of the same name and opposite Tower Hamlets Town Hall. It lies between Aldgate East and Stepney Green stations on the District and Hammersmith & City lines,  between Shoreditch High Street and Shadwell stations on the East London Line. To the West of Whitechapel on the Elizabeth Line is Liverpool Street, to the East the line splits with one branch going to Stratford and one to Canary Wharf. It is in Travelcard Zone 2.

The station was comprehensively rebuilt in the late 2010s and early 2020s as part of the Crossrail project.

History

East London Railway 
The ELR owned the tracks and stations but did not operate trains. From the beginning, various railway companies provided services through Whitechapel including the London, Brighton and South Coast Railway (LB&SCR), the London, Chatham and Dover Railway (LC&DR), Great Eastern Railway (GER) and the South Eastern Railway (SER).

District Railway 
The new station was given the name "Whitechapel (Mile End)". The ELR passenger service between Whitechapel and Liverpool Street was withdrawn in 1885. The station received its present name on 13 November 1901.

On 1 February 1902, the DR station was temporarily closed for rebuilding. It reopened on 2 June 1902, when the DR opened the Whitechapel & Bow Railway, a joint venture with the London, Tilbury and Southend Railway (LT&SR). The new extension ran eastwards to Bromley-by-Bow where it joined the LT&SR's tracks.

The DR tracks were electrified in 1905 and electric trains replaced steam trains. Services going eastwards were cut back to the limit of electrification at East Ham; later they were re-extended to Barking in 1908, and to Upminster in 1932.

Metropolitan Railway 
On 3 December 1906, the Metropolitan Railway (MR, which in 1933 became the Metropolitan line) extended its service to Whitechapel as the eastern terminus of its service. The MR also ran trains over the southern section of ELR via a connection (St Mary's Curve) between the DR tracks west of Whitechapel and the ELR tracks north of Shadwell station. The change of service took place on 31 March 1913.

During the 1980s, the London Transport considered converting the East London line into a light railway similar to the Docklands Light Railway, or restoring the then-disused connection to Liverpool Street reconnecting Whitechapel to Liverpool Street via Shoreditch.

The line had also become a line in its own right (though it was still grouped operationally with the Metropolitan line) and, from 1990, its colour on the map changed to orange. At the same time, the Hammersmith-Barking section of the Metropolitan line has also been operated separately as the Hammersmith & City line after it appeared as a completely separate line and it colour changed to pink on the tube map.

On 25 March 1995, during the construction of the Jubilee Line Extension, the East London Line was closed to allow repair works on the Thames Tunnel. General renovations and new signalling works were undertaken at the same time. The line reopened south from Whitechapel on 25 March 1998 and north from Whitechapel on 27 September 1998.

Throughout its life, Whitechapel has been used extensively as an eastern terminus; however, since the timetable change in December 2009, trains have reversed at Plaistow instead of Whitechapel. This is owing to operational changes related to the construction work to build one large island platform.

London Overground 

Services to Shoreditch had previously been run during peak hours and Sunday mornings only; these were replaced by a bus link.

Work on the extension of the East London line commenced and the line was closed on 22 December 2007. It reopened on 27 April 2010 when tracks on a new alignment were connected to a disused North London Line viaduct from Shoreditch to Dalston, making Whitechapel part of the London Overground network. Temporary bus services operated during the closure, of which rail replacement route ELW remained in service until the ELL fully opened on 23 May 2010.

In early 2015, because there were no services running on the Hammersmith & City and Circle lines between Edgware Road and Aldgate East/Tower Hill, a revised Circle line service operated between Edgware Road and Barking via Victoria. This occurred because of track drainage replacement and station works at Euston Square, Moorgate and Liverpool Street. It was the first time a regular Circle line service had called at Whitechapel.

Owing to Crossrail work that took place at Whitechapel station, Night Overground services initially did not stop at that station until works were complete. From December 2019, Night Overground began to stop additionally at Whitechapel.

Station rebuild as part of Crossrail 

In the 2010s and early 2020s, the station was comprehensively rebuilt as part of the Crossrail project. The work was undertaken by a joint venture of Balfour Beatty, Morgan Sindall and Taylor Woodrow Construction.

The work involved restoring the historic station entrance, building a new station concourse and ticket hall above the Underground and Overground tracks, widening the sub-surface line platforms, and providing an intermediate concourse above the Overground tracks – as well as platforms and other infrastructure for Elizabeth line services. 10 lifts provide step free access to all platforms, with 3 escalators providing access down to the Elizabeth line platforms. A new north-south, free public access route through the station is also provided, shortening journeys for local residents.

Originally forecast in the early 2010s to cost £110m, the work at Whitechapel is estimated to have cost around £830m. Crossrail CEO Mark Wild stated that Whitechapel was “one of the most challenging Elizabeth Line stations to construct”, with challenges including building the new concourse above live railway lines, as well as ensuring continued use of the station by passengers. A temporary ticket hall off Court Street maintained access into the station during the 5 year period that the main entrance was closed.

The revamped original entrance reopened on 23 August 2021.

When opened on 24 May 2022, services initially ran between Paddington and Abbey Wood only. Since 6 November 2022, the line splits into two branches just east of the station: one towards Shenfield, joining the Great Eastern Main Line just south of Stratford, and the other continuing to Abbey Wood The Elizabeth Line platforms lie to the north of the station, with access via escalators down from the intermediate concourse above the Overground tracks.

Bilingual signage 

Whitechapel station has bilingual station signage, owing to the large Bengali community in the local area. In March 2022, station signs on the platforms bear "Whitechapel" and also "হোয়াইটচ্যাপেল" in Bengali. It is one of the relatively few stations in England to have bilingual signage, others being Southall (Punjabi), Wallsend (Latin), Hereford (Welsh), Moreton-in-Marsh (Japanese) and St Pancras International, Ebbsfleet International and Ashford International (all French). Mayor of London Sadiq Khan stated that he was "delighted" that the signage was installed ahead of Bangladesh Independence Day on 26 March. The installation was applauded by not only Bangladeshi diplomats, but also Mamata Banerjee, the Chief Minister of West Bengal.

Design

Whitechapel has the unusual situation where the District and Hammersmith & City line London Underground platforms are located above the East London Line London Overground platforms.

District and Hammersmith & City line

The station used to have six platforms in open cuttings north of Whitechapel Road. The Hammersmith & City and District lines had two eastbound and two westbound (although trains could have reversed direction from any platform during times of disruption or engineering work). There was a siding beside platform 4 track accessed from the east side of the station which could accept a 6-car C or D stock train. There was another siding from platform 1 eastbound. This was of sufficient length and signalled to hold only a six car C stock train and when it was holding a train the platform (one) could only be used as a terminal, to reverse trains east to west, not as a through platform. The East London line (now part of London Overground) has one northbound and one southbound platform. They are sited at the eastern end of the station and are in a deeper cutting.

In September 2011 the track was permanently removed from platforms 2, 3, and 4. Platform 4 has been extended over the trackbed and westbound trains use the route of the old siding which has been connected to the main line at the western end to provide a through route. This platform is renumbered platform 2. Trailing crossovers are provided at each end of the station. The two island platforms were combined to form one large island platform with a central circulating area. A new double-ended centre reversing siding has been constructed beyond  to compensate for the loss of reversing facilities from Whitechapel. Since December 2009 Hammersmith & City line trains have not been scheduled to reverse at Whitechapel. Outside peak hours they currently reverse alternately at Plaistow and Barking.

St Mary's Curve
The St Mary's curve connection between the District line track and the East London Line was used for passenger traffic until 1941, but was subsequently only used to transfer empty trains to and from the other sub-surface lines. The curve was often lit and could easily be seen from the left-hand side of East London line trains entering Whitechapel station from the south, prior to the refurbishment of the East London line that commenced in late December 2007. The points on the District line, connecting it to the curve, were removed in summer 2008. Just west of Whitechapel is the site of the former  station, one of the many closed London Underground stations.

Artwork 
In 1997, Vitreous enamel panels designed by Doug Patterson were installed on the East London line (now part of the London Overground) platforms.

On the Elizabeth line platforms, colourful paper collages of local residents by Chantal Joffe have been recreated in aluminium. This work is titled "A Sunday afternoon in Whitechapel".

Services
The typical off-peak service of trains per hour (tph) is as follows:

Service table

Connections 
London Buses routes 25, 205, 254, D3 and night routes N25, N205 and N253 serve the station.

References

External links

 London Transport Museum Photographic collection
 
 
 
 Tube Professionals' Rumour Network – Track Diagram showing layout of station and St. Mary's curve
 Google Maps – Whitechapel station satellite view
 London Overground – Clapham Junction to Surrey Quays
 Whitechapel Station Images and Info

District line stations
Hammersmith & City line stations
Tube stations in the London Borough of Tower Hamlets
Railway stations in the London Borough of Tower Hamlets
Former East London Railway stations
Railway stations in Great Britain opened in 1876
Former Metropolitan District Railway stations
Railway stations in Great Britain opened in 1884
Railway stations in Great Britain closed in 1902
Railway stations in Great Britain opened in 1902
Railway stations served by London Overground
Railway stations served by the Elizabeth line
Railway stations with vitreous enamel panels
Railway stations located underground in the United Kingdom
Buildings and structures in Whitechapel
London Overground Night Overground stations
Whitechapel